Bedřich Antonín Wiedermann (November 10, 1883 in Ivanovice na Hané, Moravia – November 5, 1951 in Prague) was a Czech organist, composer, and teacher.

He spent his early years in study under Josef Klička and Vítězslav Novák, and taught such notable pupils as Jiří Ropek, Bedřich Janáček, and Josef Černocký. Wiedermann gained great reputation as an organist, he performed in England (1924), New York City (1924), Germany (1925), Sweden (1926), and Belgium (1935).

Selected works 
His compositional output comprises 350 opus numbers of varied instrumentation and vocal formations.

Organ
  (Three Pieces for Organ) (1912)
  (Elegy) (1920)
  (Three Choral Preludes) (1919–1927)
  (Míťa's Lullaby) (1935)
  (Lullaby) (1939)
  (Under the Czechoslovak Flag and Under the Red Flag) (1946)
  (1942)
  (1942)
  (1945)

Violin
  (Suite in Old Style) - for violin and piano (1920) (orchestrated in 1939)

Songs
  (Three Songs on Themes of Moravian Folk Songs) (1913)
  (Hanakian Carols) (1936)
  (Hanakian Songs) (1948)

Choirs
  (Two Male Choirs) (1935)
  (On the Wings of Breeze) (1945)

Cantatas
  (Miner's Cantata) (1939)
  (Cantata in Old Style) (1941)

Sacred music
  (1907–1911)
  (1948)

References

External links 
 

1883 births
1951 deaths
People from Ivanovice na Hané
Czech composers
Czech male composers
Czech organists
Male organists
Czech people of German descent
Czech music educators
20th-century organists
20th-century Czech male musicians
Burials at Vyšehrad Cemetery